Mackinaw is a village in Tazewell County, Illinois, United States, and is part of the Peoria, Illinois Metropolitan Statistical Area. Its population was 1,950 at the 2010 census. Local businesses include Area 52 Paintball, and Mackinaw Valley Vineyard. The Mack-Ca-Fest Farm Days Festival is held each June in the village.

History
The village lies within, but is politically independent of Mackinaw Township. Both take their name from the nearby Mackinaw River. Mackinaw (sometimes spelled Mackinac) is derived from the Ojibwe word mikinaak'' meaning "turtle".

Following the 1933 end to prohibition, Mackinaw remained a "dry" community through 2013, when residents voted to allow the sale of alcohol.

Geography
Mackinaw is located at  (40.533977, -89.358630).

Demographics

As of the census of 2010, there were 1,950 people, 746 households, and 540 families residing in the village. The population density was 1,416.4 people per square mile and there were 799 housing units. The racial makeup of the village was 97.69% White, 0.72% African American, 0.15% Native American, 0.36% Asian, 0% Pacific Islander, 0.21% from other races, and 0.87% from two or more races. Hispanic or Latino of any race was 1.69% of the population.

There were 579 households, out of which 35.8% had children under the age of 18 living with them, 56.0% were married couples living together, 10.3% had a female householder with no husband present, and 27.6% were non-families. 22.7% of all households were made up of individuals living alone, and 10.7% had someone living alone who was 65 years of age or older. The average household size was 2.61 and the average family size was 3.08.

In the village, the population was spread out, with 31.1% under the age of 19, 33.4% from 20 to 44, 28.4% from 25 to 44, 21.8% from 45 to 64, and 13.5% who were 65 years of age or older. The median age was 35.4 years. For every 100 females, there were 97.6 males. For every 100 females age 18 and over, there were 95.1 males.

The median income for a household in the village was $61,083 and the median income for a family was $71,027. Males had a median income of $40,147 versus $21,429 for females. About 1% of families and 1.53% of the population were below the poverty line.

Schools
Their high school is Deer Creek-Mackinaw High School and it is located on 401 E. Fifth St, Mackinaw, IL. Both students from Mackinaw and Deer Creek, Illinois attend Deemack High School. Dee-Mack athletics participate in the Heart of Illinois Conference and in 2012 their girls' volleyball team won the class 2A state title.  This was Dee-Mack's first state championship. On November 25, 2016, Dee-Mack's football team played in their first football state championship game in 29 years. They played Maroa-Forsyth for the class 2A Illinois State Championship in Champaign, Illinois at the University of Illinois' Memorial Stadium. They won the game 35–7, which was the first state championship in football for the school. They finished their season with a 13–1 record.

References

External links
Village of Mackinaw official website
Deemack High School website

Villages in Tazewell County, Illinois
Villages in Illinois
Peoria metropolitan area, Illinois
1827 establishments in Illinois
Populated places established in 1827